Lt-General Archibald Douglas of Kirkton (1707 – 8 November 1778) was a Scottish Army officer and Member of Parliament.

He was the eldest son of William Douglas of Fingland and Elizabeth (Betty) Clerk. His father, a former Jacobite, had been forced to sell the family estate.

He joined the army as a Cornet in the 4th Dragoons (then Sir Robert Rich's Dragoons) in 1739, rising to lieutenant in 1742, captain in 1745, major in 1746, lieutenant-colonel in 1746, colonel in 1756, major-general in 1759 and lieutenant-general in 1761. He took part in the Battles of Dettingen (where he had 3 horses shot from under him and an eyebrow shot away) and Minden. In 1756 he was made Aide-de-Camp to King George II. In 1758 he was made Regimental Colonel of the 13th Dragoons, a position he held until his death.

In 1763 he purchased a country house in Newland Street, Witham, Essex which was later known as White Hall. 

Douglas died in Dublin in 1778 and was buried at St Nicholas church, Witham, where there is a memorial to him. He had married in 1746 Elizabeth, daughter of Edmund Burchard of Witham, Essex, with whom he had 6 sons, including Philip, and 5 daughters.

References

1707 births
1778 deaths
Members of the Parliament of Great Britain for Scottish constituencies
British MPs 1754–1761
British MPs 1761–1768
British MPs 1768–1774
Place of birth missing
People from Dumfries
13th Hussars officers
British Army lieutenant generals
British Army personnel of the War of the Austrian Succession